Promecc Aerospace s.r.l. (formerly Pro.Mecc S.r.l.) is an Italian aircraft manufacturer based in Corigliano d'Otranto. The company specializes in the design and manufacture of ultralight aircraft predominantly using carbon fibre construction.

The company's first design, the Sparviero was introduced in the 2000s.

Aircraft

See also

List of Italian companies

References

External links

Aircraft manufacturers of Italy
Companies established in 2003
Italian companies established in 2003